Eranholi is a census town and suburb of Thalassery in Tellicherry Municipality  in the state of Kerala, India, and located on Tellichery Mysore highway. The nearest town is Chirakkara. Eranholi bridge built across Eranholi river in 1937 which is entry to Tellicherry.The Eranholi Bridge is a significant bridge of TC Road.

The College of Engineering, Thalassery is located at Kundoormala, a hilly area near Eranholi.

Demographics
As of 2011  Census, Eranholi had a population of 25,818. Males constitute 45.5% of the population and females 54.5%. The average sex ratio was 1199 higher than state average of 1084. Eranholi had an average literacy rate of 98.3%, higher than state average of 94%: male literacy was 98.8%, and female literacy was 97.9%. In Eranholi, 8.6% of the population is under 6 years of age.

Transportation
The national highway passes through Thalassery town.  Goa and Mumbai can be accessed on the northern side and Cochin and Thiruvananthapuram can be accessed on the southern side.  The road to the east of Iritty connects to Mysore and Bangalore. The nearest railway station is Thalassery on Mangalore-Palakkad line. Trains are available to almost all parts of India subject to advance booking over the internet.  There are airports at Mangalore, Calicut and new airport Kannur International Airport which is located 25 kilometers away . All of them are international airports but direct flights are available only to Middle Eastern countries. Water transport project is an upcoming project in Eranholi

See also
 Tellicherry

References

Villages near Thalassery
Cities and towns in Kannur district